Brian Posehn (born July 6, 1966) is an American stand-up comedian, actor, voice actor, musician, and writer. After numerous appearances as a television guest star, Posehn acquired his first major recurring role in HBO's Mr. Show with Bob and David (1995–1998). He is known for his roles as Jim Kuback on The WB's Mission Hill and Brian Spukowski on Comedy Central's The Sarah Silverman Program. Posehn had a recurring role on The Big Bang Theory as geologist Bert Kibbler.

As a stand-up comedian, Posehn has released four comedy albums and one standalone music album. He has hosted the online Dungeons & Dragons podcast Nerd Poker since 2012. He has also done voice work for video games such as Halo 2, FusionFall, Brütal Legend, and Minecraft: Story Mode.

Posehn received nominations for two Primetime Emmy Awards in 1998 and 1999 for Outstanding Writing for a Variety or Music Program for his work on Mr. Show with Bob and David, which he shared with the series' writing crew. Posehn also received a nomination for a DVDX Award for Best Original Song in a DVD Premiere Movie in 2003 for Run Ronnie Run!.

Early life
Posehn was born and raised in Sacramento, California. He is of German and Irish descent. He graduated from Sonoma Valley High School in 1984. He attended college at California State University, Sacramento.

Career

Television work
Posehn began with guest appearances and mainly small roles in TV shows. He was on 28 episodes of Mr. Show with Bob and David (1995–1998), a sketch comedy series on HBO. In a 1996 episode of Friends, he delivered the manuscript in which Joey Tribbiani's soap opera character "Dr. Drake Ramoray" is killed. He appeared as two different characters in NewsRadio: a fan with questions for Jimmy James at a book reading (1997), and a member of Dave's a cappella group "Chock Full o' Notes" (1998). In the Seinfeld episode "The Burning" (1998), he played a patient, when Kramer "was given" gonorrhea. His character was instructed to "act out" to a group of medical students how a surgeon left a sponge in him post surgery. Posehn also wrote the Space Ghost: Coast to Coast episode "Cahill" (1998) with Ben Karlin. He appeared on 29 episodes of the NBC series Just Shoot Me! (1999–2003). He played the voice of Jim in Mission Hill on the WB (1999–2002), and Del Swanson in 3 South on MTV (2002–2003). On an Adult Swim production, Aqua Teen Hunger Force, he voiced the Wisdom Cube in the 2003 episode "The Cubing".

Posehn performed the voice of Gibbons, a tiny man, on several episodes of the Cartoon Network's Tom Goes to the Mayor (2005–2006). He also appeared in the 2005 pilot for The Showbiz Show with David Spade, in a segment called "The Nerd Perspective", in which he gave a scathing criticism of MTV and its declining quality. He also played a mortician in several episodes of Comedy Central's Reno 911!. He was featured on the 2005 documentary series The Comedians of Comedy on Comedy Central and Showtime. He was in a 2007 episode of the improv series Thank God You're Here on NBC and was a celebrity judge on the revived 1970s game show The Gong Show with Dave Attell (2008), on Comedy Central. He co-stars on The Sarah Silverman Program with Steve Agee as a gay couple who is friends with Silverman, and also wrote the season three finale "Wowschwitz". He played himself in the episode "Spagett" of Tim and Eric Awesome Show, Great Job!, appeared at the Comedy Central Roast of Bob Saget, played the role of a physically disabled man (Scooter Man) in the second season's premiere episode "Slip of the Tongue" of Californication (2008), on Showtime, and played Dethklok's second manager in the Metalocalypse episode "Dethsources", he also wrote the episode "Fatherklok". In 2007 he joined the first season of the MTV sketch comedy series Human Giant, as a writer and performer, and voices Glen Furlblam, the biggest fan of Dr. Two-Brains on the PBS Kids animated series WordGirl. In 2012 he co-wrote the fourth season of Metalocalypse. From 2013 to 2019, Posehn portrayed the recurring character Bert on The Big Bang Theory.

Film work

Movie appearances from Posehn include the 2003 comedy film sequel Dumb and Dumberer: When Harry Met Lloyd, Grind, the 2005 Rob Zombie horror film The Devil's Rejects, Sleeping Dogs Lie, Fantastic Four: Rise of the Silver Surfer, and the 2007 animated feature Surf's Up, where he played Glen Maverick. Posehn appeared as himself in the 2007 documentary  Super High Me starring 'marijuana comedian' Doug Benson, the 2008 documentary Nerdcore Rising about MC Frontalot and in a supporting role in Sarah Silverman: Jesus Is Magic.

Posehn voices the character of Murray, a robot, in Rob Zombie's animated The Haunted World of El Superbeasto. He also voiced the character Hayashi in the English dub of Pom Poko.

Stand-up comedy
In 2002, Posehn appeared on Comedy Central Presents, followed by the release of 2005's The Comedians of Comedy, a documentary/live special chronicling a 2004 small-club comedy tour he participated in. The film was followed up by a television series on Comedy Central of the same name. Posehn's debut comedy album Live In: Nerd Rage was released in 2006. He participated in the Comedy Lineup of the 2008 Bonnaroo Music and Arts Festival, which included Louis C.K., Janeane Garofalo and Zach Galifianakis. Posehn performed as part of the Rock N' Roll Comedy set with Jim Norton and Michelle Buteau. During his 2008 routine on Comedy Central Presents he referred to his Wikipedia article, which he supposedly vandalized. In 2010, Posehn released his second album Fart and Wiener Jokes. In 2011, Posehn agreed to perform at the Gathering of the Juggalos. Some of his fans criticized this decision as being "not metal". Posehn countered that "getting a paycheck is metal", and expressed respect towards the Juggalo fan culture, as well as the independent music success of Insane Clown Posse and Psychopathic Records. In 2013, Posehn released his third comedy album and first DVD, The Fartist, and in 2017 his fourth comedy album, Posehn 25x2.

Music
In 2006, Relapse Records released his first album, Live In: Nerd Rage. It includes "Metal by Numbers", a song mocking the formulaic nature of modern "metal" at the time of its release. The instrumental tracks feature musicians such as guitarist Scott Ian (of Anthrax), bassist Joey Vera (then of Anthrax, but also of Armored Saint and Fates Warning), drummer John Tempesta (of The Cult and White Zombie), and lead guitarist Jonathan Donais (of Shadows Fall). Posehn also appeared in the Anthrax music videos for "What Doesn't Die" and "Blood Eagle Wings". Posehn appeared on a Season 4 episode of the music talk show That Metal Show and Lamb of God's Walk With Me In Hell DVD, and performed "More Metal Then You", a song that was included on his non-musical stand-up comedy album Fart & Weiner Jokes, with "Brian Posehn's All-Star Band" on the 2010 Revolver Golden Gods Awards. Posehn appeared in The Damned Things music video for "We've Got A Situation Here". He provided backing vocals for Evile's album Five Serpent's Teeth.

In 2020, Posehn released his first music-only album, Grandpa Metal, which featured guest appearances from Brendon Small of Dethklok, Scott Ian, Corey Taylor of Slipknot and Stone Sour, Weird Al Yankovic, Phil Demmel of Machine Head, Michael Starr of Steel Panther and others. The album consists of comedy metal songs, as well as metal covers of "Take On Me" by A-Ha and "The Fox (What Does the Fox Say?)" by Ylvis.

Other work
Posehn has provided voice work for video games Brütal Legend as The Hunter and Star Warped as co-narrator Brian. Posehn has also voiced Grunts and various Marines in the 2004 video game Halo 2.

Posehn appeared in the commercial "Ink Fairy" for Staples office supply store in its ad campaign featuring the "Easy Button."

In 2006, Posehn co-wrote the comic book The Last Christmas with writer Gerry Duggan, published by Image Comics.

In April 2009 Posehn hosted the first American "Golden Gods Awards" for metal music hosted by Revolver Magazine.

As part of the Marvel NOW! initiative Posehn and Gerry Duggan co-wrote the Deadpool ongoing comic series which launched in November 2012, lasting 45 issues. His run ended in April 2015. The first six issues were illustrated by Tony Moore.

Since 2012, Posehn has hosted a podcast called Nerd Poker, where a group of comedians play Dungeons & Dragons. Co-hosts include comic book writer Gerry Duggan and comedian Blaine Capatch, among others.

Posehn has also participated in the Dungeons & Dragons campaign Force Grey: Lost City of Omu, hosted by Matthew Mercer.

Personal life
Posehn married Melanie Truhett in 2004 and has a son with her.  While once known for his use of cannabis, Posehn quit smoking marijuana in 2011, but resumed smoking about three years later.

Filmography

Film

Television

Music videos

Video games

Podcasts

Discography
 Live In: Nerd Rage (2006) – stand-up comedy
 Fart and Wiener Jokes (2010) – stand-up comedy
 The Fartist (2013) – stand-up comedy
 Posehn 25x2 (2017) – stand-up comedy
 Grandpa Metal (2020) – as Posehn; music only

Accolades
Posehn has been nominated for two Primetime Emmys and one DVDX Award. His first Primetime Emmy nomination in 1998 for Outstanding Writing for a Variety or Music Program was for his writing on Mr. Show with Bob and David, which he shared with crew members Scott Aukerman, Jerry Collins, David Cross, Jay Johnston, Bob Odenkirk, Bill Odenkirk, B. J. Porter, and Dino Stamatopoulos. The television series' writing staff, including Posehn, received another nomination in the same category in 1999, which Posehn shared with Mike Stoyanov, Paul F. Tompkins, Mike Upchurch, and past writing staff from the previous year.

For his work on Run Ronnie Run!, Posehn was nominated at the 2003 DVD Exclusive Awards for Best Original Song in a DVD Premiere Movie for "The Golden Rule Song" along with performer Jack Black (with the Joey Cheesy Reunion Band) and fellow lyricists David Cross, Bob Odenkirk, Scott Aukerman, B. J. Porter, and Eban Schletter.

Bibliography

Image Comics
 The Last Christmas (tpb, 176 pages, 2006)

Marvel Comics
 Deadpool:
 Volume 1: Dead Presidents (collects Deadpool (Marvel Now!) vol. 3 #1–6, 154 pages, Marvel Comics, softcover, May 2013)
 Volume 2: Soul Hunter (collects Deadpool (Marvel Now!) vol. 3 #7–12, 137 pages, Marvel Comics, softcover, August 2013)
 Volume 3: The Good, the Bad and the Ugly (collects Deadpool (Marvel Now!) vol. 3 #13–19, 160 pages, Marvel Comics, softcover, January 2014)
 Volume 4: Deadpool vs. S.H.I.E.L.D. (collects Deadpool (Marvel Now!) vol. 3 #20–25, 136 pages, Marvel Comics, softcover, June 2014)
 Volume 5: The Wedding of Deadpool (collects Deadpool (Marvel Now!) vol. 3 #26–28 and Deadpool Annual #1, 168 pages, Marvel Comics, softcover, August 2014)
 Volume 6: Original Sin (collects Deadpool (Marvel Now!) vol. 3 #29–34, 144 pages, Marvel Comics, softcover, December 2014)
 Volume 7: Axis (collects Deadpool (Marvel Now!) vol. 3 #35–40, 136 pages, Marvel Comics, softcover, March 2015)
 Volume 8: All Good Things (collects Deadpool (Marvel Now!) vol. 3 #41–44, #250, 176 pages, Marvel Comics, softcover, June 2015)
 Dracula's Gauntlet (collects Deadpool: Dracula's Gauntlet (Marvel Now!) vol. 1 #1–7, 200 pages, Marvel Comics, softcover, November 2014)

References

External links

 BrianPosehn.com, Official website
 Brian Posehn on MySpace
 Brian Posehn at Comedy Central

Interviews
 
 
 
 
 

American male film actors
American heavy metal singers
American sketch comedians
American stand-up comedians
American male television actors
American television writers
American male comedians
American male television writers
American male voice actors
Living people
Male actors from Sacramento, California
Relapse Records artists
People from Sonoma, California
American comics writers
American people of German descent
American people of Irish descent
American writers of Italian descent
Comedians from California
Screenwriters from California
21st-century American comedians
21st-century American screenwriters
21st-century American male writers
1966 births